Magadhi Prakrit (Māgadhī) is of one of the three Dramatic Prakrits, the written languages of Ancient India following the decline of Pali and Sanskrit. It was a vernacular Middle Indo-Aryan language, replacing earlier Vedic Sanskrit.

History and overview
Magadhi Prakrit was spoken in the eastern Indian subcontinent, in a region spanning what is now eastern India, Bangladesh and Nepal. Associated with the ancient Magadha, it was spoken in present-day Assam, Bengal, Bihar, Jharkhand, Odisha and eastern Uttar Pradesh under various apabhramsa dialects, and used in some dramas to represent vernacular dialogue in Prakrit dramas. It is believed to be the language spoken by the important religious figures Gautama Buddha and Mahavira and was also the language of the courts of the Magadha mahajanapada and the Maurya Empire; some of the Edicts of Ashoka were composed in it.

Magadhi Prakrit later evolved into the Eastern Indo-Aryan languages:
Bengali–Assamese
Bihari
Halbic
Odia'''

References

External links
 Map of Magadh
 Magahi Culture
 Magahi Language
 Jain Agams
 Jainism in Buddhist Literature
 

Indo-Aryan languages
Prakrit languages
Formal languages used for Indian scriptures
Magahi language